Barrington Plaza is an apartment complex in Los Angeles, California, located at 11740 Wilshire Boulevard in the Sawtelle community of Los Angeles, California .  At the time of its completion, in 1962, it was described as the largest privately built apartment development in the western United States.

Design
As originally constructed, the plaza consisted of three high-rise buildings which contained 712 apartments. It also included retail and restaurant space, a  parking garage and a recreational building.

It was both the largest, and the tallest, privately built apartment complex west of Chicago.

History
Planning for Barrington Plaza began in 1958, when it was initially envisaged to cost $14 million.  It was originally conceived and developed by the B.C. Deane Company, based in Van Nuys, and designed by architect Phillip Daniel of DMJM, which later became AECOM.  Louis Lesser Enterprises were brought in as partners at the beginning of 1959, subsequently becoming the sole sponsor and buying out Deane in June 1961.  Construction started in 1960; it was completed in 1962 and cost about $20 million.  A year after completion, around 50% of the units had been sold.

In 1961, Barrington Plaza and its developer, Ben Deane, were selected for an award by the National Association of Home Builders.

The original application for a $14 million Federal Housing Administration loan was described as the largest single application for an insurance commitment under the urban renewal program ever filed in the United States; the actual initial loan was $15.2 million towards the end of 1959.  This was reported to have increased to $16.7 million on completion in 1962, and then to $18.6 by the end of Louis Lesser Enterprises' ownership in 1965.  In that year, Barrington Plaza was sold to a group from Ohio.  In 1966, following foreclosure on the loan after it reached $21 million, the US Senate Permanent Subcommittee on Investigations held hearings into investments secured by the FHA, with Barrington Plaza being the first they addressed.

In 1998, the property was purchased by Douglas Emmett, Inc.

On January 29, 2020, a multiple alarm fire occurred at 8:30 am at Barrington Plaza causing 11 reported injuries and extensive damage to the 6th floor.  Some residents were rescued by helicopter from the roof.

References

Apartment buildings in Los Angeles
Wilshire Boulevard
West Los Angeles
Residential skyscrapers in Los Angeles